Conophthorus is a genus of typical bark beetles in the family Curculionidae. There are about 10 described species in Conophthorus.

Species
 Conophthorus apachecae Hopkins, 1915
 Conophthorus banksianae McPherson, 1970
 Conophthorus cembroides Wood, 1971
 Conophthorus coniperda (Schwarz, 1895) (white pine cone beetle)
 Conophthorus echinatae Wood, 1978
 Conophthorus edulis Hopkins, 1915 (pinon cone beetle)
 Conophthorus monophyllae Hopkins, 1915
 Conophthorus ponderosae Hopkins, 1915 (lodgepole cone beetle)
 Conophthorus radiatae Hopkins, 1915
 Conophthorus resinosae Hopkins, 1915

References

 Poole, Robert W., and Patricia Gentili, eds. (1996). "Coleoptera". Nomina Insecta Nearctica: A Check List of the Insects of North America, vol. 1: Coleoptera, Strepsiptera, 41-820.

Further reading

 Arnett, R. H. Jr., M. C. Thomas, P. E. Skelley and J. H. Frank. (eds.). (21 June 2002). American Beetles, Volume II: Polyphaga: Scarabaeoidea through Curculionoidea. CRC Press LLC, Boca Raton, Florida .
 Arnett, Ross H. (2000). American Insects: A Handbook of the Insects of America North of Mexico. CRC Press.
 Richard E. White. (1983). Peterson Field Guides: Beetles. Houghton Mifflin Company.

Scolytinae